Mark Helfrich (born November 13, 1957) is an American film editor and director. He is an elected member of American Cinema Editors (ACE) and serves on the board as an associate director. Helfrich has edited over thirty films such as Stone Cold (1991), Showgirls (1995) with Mark Goldblatt. Helfrich is also the primary editor for director Brett Ratner's films, such as Money Talks (1997), Rush Hour (1998), The Family Man (2000), Rush Hour 2 (2001), Red Dragon (2002), and After the Sunset (2004), X-Men: The Last Stand (2006), Kites (2010) with Mark Goldblatt and Julia Wong. Helfrich directed Good Luck Chuck.

He has also edited, with Brett Ratner's direction, a version of the Hollywood film production titled Kites:The Remix a.k.a. Kites (2010), as well as the pilot episode for Prison Break, an American-based TV drama series produced by Brett Ratner. Helfrich edited Brett Ratner's music video Beautiful Stranger featuring Madonna.

Filmography

References

External links 

American film editors
American Cinema Editors
American film directors
1957 births
Living people